ADSM may refer to

 ad sectam, legal term
 ADSL Mobile, Italian mobile telecommunications company
 Abu Dhabi Securities Market, stock exchange in the UAE
 Active Disassembly using Smart Materials, developing technology for re-use of materials
 Adstar Distributed Storage Manager, an IBM data protection platform
 Air Defense Suppression Missile, variant of the Stinger surface-to-air missile
 American Defense Service Medal, military award established by Franklin D. Roosevelt
 A political party in the November 1946 French legislative election in Algeria

Initialisms